Reuben Jeffery III (born August 21, 1953) is the former United States Under Secretary of State for Economic, Business, and Agricultural Affairs, having been appointed to that position by United States President George W. Bush in June 2007. Presently, Reuben Jeffery III is the President, Chief Executive Officer and member of the board of Rockefeller & Co. and Rockefeller Financial Services, Inc. He is a member of the International Advisory Committee of J. Rothschild Capital Management Limited.

Early life
Reuben Jeffery III was born on August 21, 1953.

Jeffery attended Yale University, receiving a Bachelor of Arts in Political Science in 1975. Upon graduation, he joined the management program at Morgan Guaranty Trust Company in New York City. He then moved to Stanford University, where he received both an Master of Business Administration and a Juris Doctor in 1981 (as part of the joint program between the Stanford Graduate School of Business and Stanford Law School).

Career
Jeffery initially accepted an offer from Davis Polk & Wardwell, before moving on to Goldman Sachs in 1983. He became Managing Partner of Goldman Sachs's European Financial Institutions Group in London in 1992, and then Managing Partner of the Goldman Sachs Paris office in 1997.

Jeffery supported the candidacy of George W. Bush in the 2000 presidential election. In the wake of 9/11, President Bush appointed Jeffery as his Special Advisor on Lower Manhattan Development, and in 2002, Jeffery left Goldman Sachs to take on this responsibility. In 2003, Jeffery became a Special Advisor to L. Paul Bremer, head of the Coalition Provisional Authority in Iraq and then became the Representative and Executive Director of the Coalition Provisional Authority Office in The Pentagon.

He served as a member of the United States National Security Council until 2005, as a Senior Director responsible for International Economic Affairs. Currently he sits in the Board of Directors of Barclays.

In 2005, Jeffery was named the chairman of the Commodity Futures Trading Commission.

President Bush nominated Jeffery as Under Secretary of State for Economic, Business, and Agricultural Affairs on April 16, 2007 and he was confirmed by the United States Senate on June 21, 2007. He was sworn in by United States Secretary of State Condoleezza Rice on June 27, 2007.

Currently Reuben Jeffery III serves as senior advisor at CSIS (Center for Strategic and International Studies). On July 27, 2010, Jeffery was hired to be CEO of Rockefeller & Co., a NYC-based asset manager with $43 billion under management.

On May 8, 2012, Jeffery was reported donating $32,000 to Romney Victory Inc.

In 2013, Jeffery was a signatory to an amicus curiae brief submitted to the Supreme Court in support of same-sex marriage during the Hollingsworth v. Perry case.

Personal life 
He is married to Robin Jeffery. They have three children.

References

External links
Biography at the State Department Website
Website of the Under Secretary of State for Economic, Business, and Agricultural Affairs

1953 births
Living people
Yale University alumni
Stanford Graduate School of Business alumni
Stanford Law School alumni
Goldman Sachs people
American people of the Iraq War
Coalition Provisional Authority
Commodity Futures Trading Commission personnel
United States Department of State officials
United States National Security Council staffers
Davis Polk & Wardwell lawyers
George W. Bush administration personnel